German submarine U-545 was a Type IXC U-boat of Nazi Germany's Kriegsmarine during World War II.

She was laid down at the Deutsche Werft (yard) in Hamburg as yard number 366 on 1 August 1942, launched on 3 March 1943 and commissioned on 19 May with Kapitänleutnant Gert Mannesmann in command.

U-545 began her service career with training as part of the 4th U-boat Flotilla from 19 May 1943. She was reassigned to the 2nd flotilla for operations on 1 December.

She carried out one patrol and damaged one ship. She was a member of five wolfpacks.

She was scuttled on 10 February 1944 west of the Hebrides after an attack by Allied aircraft.

Design
German Type IXC/40 submarines were slightly larger than the original Type IXCs. U-545 had a displacement of  when at the surface and  while submerged. She had two shafts and two  propellers.

U-545 was fitted with six  torpedo tubes (four fitted at the bow and two at the stern), 22 torpedoes, one  SK C/32 naval gun, 180 rounds, and a  SK C/30 as well as a  C/30 anti-aircraft gun. The boat had a complement of forty-eight.

Service history

Patrol and loss
The boat departed Kiel on 9 December 1943, moved through the North Sea, negotiated the 'gap' between Iceland and the Faroe Islands and entered the Atlantic Ocean.

She damaged Empire Housman on 31 December.

The first Watch Officer (1WO), Oberleutnant zur See Hans Wilkening, was swept overboard on 26 January 1944.

On 10 February 1944 U-545 was scuttled following damage from an attack by a Vickers Wellington of No. 612 Squadron RAF. A Canadian Wellington from 407 Squadron RCAF was also involved, but was shot down.

One man died in the U-boat; there were 56 survivors.

Summary of raiding history

References

Bibliography

External links

German Type IX submarines
U-boats commissioned in 1943
U-boats sunk in 1944
World War II submarines of Germany
1943 ships
World War II shipwrecks in the Atlantic Ocean
Ships built in Hamburg
Maritime incidents in February 1944